Bernard Edward Epton (August 25, 1921 – December 13, 1987) was an American politician who served in the Illinois House of Representatives from 1969 to 1983. He is most remembered for his candidacy as the Republican nominee in the close and contentious Chicago mayoral election of 1983.

Biography

Early life and career
Epton served in World War II in the U.S. Army Air Force, for which he flew twenty-five missions over Germany and twice earned the Distinguished Flying Cross. During the postwar years, Epton became a successful attorney with a speciality in insurance law. A graduate of the University of Chicago and DePaul University College of Law, he was an unsuccessful liberal Republican candidate for U.S. Representative from Illinois' 2nd congressional district in 1960. With John F. Kennedy narrowly winning Illinois that year, Epton lost to the Democratic incumbent, Barratt O'Hara. Known for being witty and occasionally sharp-tongued, Epton was elected to the Illinois House of Representatives in 1969 and served until 1983. He chaired the chamber's Insurance Committee.

Chicago mayoral election of 1983

A resident of the Hyde Park neighborhood of Chicago, Epton ran against the liberal African American Democrat Harold Washington in the mayoral election in the spring of 1983. In a racially charged election, Epton came within 40,000 votes (of 1.2 million cast) of defeating the Democratic nominee. His total was the high-water mark for Chicago Republicans in elections for mayor in the heavily Democratic city. Epton received 81 percent of the votes of Chicago whites, and 3 percent from blacks. One of Epton's campaign slogans was "Epton for mayor... Before it's too late," which critics declared had racial overtones.

By his own account, Epton became uncomfortable with the racially-oriented nature of his campaign because he had been an active participant in the Civil Rights Movement of the 1960s. He would have become the city's first Jewish mayor (an accomplishment that eventually was claimed by Rahm Emanuel when he was elected in 2011) and its first Republican mayor since William Hale Thompson left office in 1931.

Later life and death
After being defeated by Washington, Epton briefly returned to private life.

Epton tried seeking the Republican nomination for mayor again in 1987 mayoral election, but failed to collect enough signatures to get on the ballot.

Four years after the 1983 mayoral election (and fewer than three weeks after Mayor Washington died suddenly of a heart attack) Epton himself suffered a coronary and died in Ann Arbor, Michigan, at the age of sixty-six on December 13, 1987. Epton was there visiting his son Jeffrey David "Jeff" Epton (born c. 1947), a socialist member of the Ann Arbor City Council and long-time critic of capital punishment.

References

1921 births
1987 deaths
Republican Party members of the Illinois House of Representatives
Politicians from Chicago
Jewish American state legislators in Illinois
Illinois lawyers
University of Chicago alumni
DePaul University College of Law alumni
United States Army Air Forces pilots of World War II
Recipients of the Distinguished Flying Cross (United States)
Activists for African-American civil rights
20th-century American lawyers
20th-century American politicians
20th-century American Jews
Military personnel from Chicago